was a daimyō of the Yamagata Domain in Dewa Province, in the late Sengoku and early Edo periods. Known as "Fox of Dewa".

Biography
Mogami Yoshiaki was the first son of Mogami Yoshimori (最上 義守), of the Mogami clan and succeeded his father as daimyō of Yamagata. When Yoshihime, who was his sister, married Date Terumune, the Mogami clan allies with the Date clan. During this time, Yoshihime wrote information about the Date clan to Yoshiaki, her and Yoshiaki's actions made the Date clan distrust the Mogami family. Yoshiaki fought against the Date clan twice in different years, in both battles Yoshihime advanced to the middle of the battlefield to create a peace treaty.

In 1571, Mogami Yoshiaki officially became the head of the Mogami clan. 

In 1588, he expanded the Mogami territory enormously in the Shōnai and Semboku areas, and threatened Yoshiuji Daihoji, who sought aid from Honjō Shigenaga at 'Battle of Jugorihara'.

When Toyotomi Hideyoshi came to power, Mogami submitted to his rule, as a result, he was given about 200,000 koku by Toyotomi Hideyoshi after the Siege of Odawara and participated in attacking Kunohe Rebellion. But later Yoshiaki became a supporter of Tokugawa Ieyasu following Hideyoshi's death. He was known to hate the Toyotomi because Hideyoshi ordered the execution of Yoshiaki's teenage daughter when purging his nephew Toyotomi Hidetsugu, to whom Yoshiaki's daughter was engaged. Hideyoshi refused to spare the life of Yoshiaki's 15-year-old daughter, who had only just arrived in Kyoto to become Hidestugu's concubine and had not yet even met her husband-to-be.

In 1600, he battled Uesugi Kagekatsu, an enemy of Tokugawa's, alongside Date Masamune (his nephew), another lord of the far north. Mogami and Date supported Ieyasu at the famous Sekigahara campaign, he aided in Date's siege of Shiroishi, and was then attacked in his own home castle of Hataya, Kaminoyama and Hasedō. After which Mogami's domain was expanded to 570,000 koku in return for his loyal service. This made the Yamagata domain the fifth largest in Japan at the time, excluding the land held by Tokugawa.

Death
He died at Yamagata Castle in 1614. Yamagata maintains the Mogami Yoshiaki Historical Museum, just outside the rebuilt Great Eastern Gate of Yamagata Castle, which displays his helmet, battle command baton and other implements he actually used.

Legacy
Mogami Yoshiaki laid out and built the castle town, which became the foundation of modern-day Yamagata City. He controlled the "Three Difficult Places" on the Mogami River, making navigation safer from the Sea of Japan to the inland, and bringing the culture of Kyōto and Ōsaka to Yamagata. His dam building projects at Kitadaseki, Inabazeki and other places, and other irrigation control measures helped develop rice cultivation in the Shōnai plain.

Notable vassals
 Tateoka Mitsushige
 Sakenobe Hidetsuna
 Ujiie Sadanao
 Ujiie Munemori
 Shimura Akiyasu

Sources
Stephen Turnbull. The Samurai Sourcebook. London: Cassell & Co. (1998)
Dewa no Taishu Mogami Yoshiaki

References

1544 births
1614 deaths
16th-century Japanese people
17th-century Japanese people
Daimyo
Mogami clan